Charles Walter McKeer (1883 – 2 March 1957) was an English professional footballer who made four appearances in the midfield for Southampton in the Southern League in 1910 and 1911.

Football career
McKeer was born in Farnham, Surrey and initially joined Southampton as an amateur in 1904, without making any first-team appearances. He later joined the Royal Army Medical Corps based at Aldershot and played football for them in the Hampshire League.

In April 1910, he left the army and signed as a professional for Southampton, making his first-team debut playing at inside-left in the final match of the 1909–10 season, a 3–1 victory over already-relegated Reading. McKeer made three further appearances in the following season, one at inside-left and two at left-half (as replacement for Bert Trueman), all three of which ended in defeats.

McKeer was released in the 1911 close season.

References

External links
Career details

1883 births
People from Farnham
1957 deaths
English footballers
Association football midfielders
Southampton F.C. players
20th-century British Army personnel
Royal Army Medical Corps soldiers